Chernigovka is a rural locality (a selo) in Chernigovsky Selsoviet of Svobodnensky District, Amur Oblast, Russia. The population was 459 as of 2018. There are 11 streets.

Geography 
Chernigovka is located 22 km northeast of Svobodny (the district's administrative centre) by road. Yukhta-3 is the nearest rural locality.

References 

Rural localities in Svobodnensky District